Podgorica pri Podtaboru (in older sources also Mala Podgorica) is a small settlement north of Šent Jurij in the Municipality of Grosuplje in central Slovenia. The area is part of the historical region of Lower Carniola. The municipality is now included in the Central Slovenia Statistical Region.

Name
The name of the settlement was changed from Podgorica to Podgorica pri Podtaboru in 1953.

Cultural heritage
A small roadside chapel-shrine in the village is dedicated to Saint Peter and dates to the early 20th century.

References

External links

Podgorica pri Podtaboru on Geopedia

Populated places in the Municipality of Grosuplje